Rolf Thomas Öberg (born 15 March 1967) is a Swedish musical personality best known as the singer in the acclaimed group bob hund. He was named, in 2000, as the country's best singer.  He has gained renown for his musical depth and unique lyrics as well as extremely energetic stage presence.

A native of the coastal city of Helsingborg, the seat of Helsingborg Municipality in Skåne County, at the southernmost tip of the Scandinavian Peninsula, Öberg moved to Stockholm in 1987, at the age of 20.  As singer and lyricist for the Swedish indie bands bob hund, Bergman Rock and Sci-Fi SKANE, he has been involved in many other musical endeavours, including former bands Oven & Stove, Instant Life, and a solo project going by the pseudonym of Walter L. Ego, as well as a new group with the name, 27#11, a collaboration with Graham Lewis of Wire.  His fame is also credited to the original nature and depth of his lyrics along with his stage presence, which expends so much energy that, in one frequently recounted incident, he broke a leg during a performance. In 1994, he and his band, bob hund, received a Grammis (the Grammy of the Swedish music industry) for "Best Live Band" and another in 1996 for "Best Lyrics", which Öberg is known for delivering in his native dialect of Skånska. Having been named Sweden's best singer in 2000, he has also won awards for his lyrics and for the band's live performances.

External links

Swedish male singers
People from Helsingborg
1967 births
Living people